AWC is a three letter acronym that may refer to:

Educational institutions
Allegheny Wesleyan College, a private liberal arts college in Ohio
Air War College, a part of Air University, at Maxwell-Gunter Air Force Base, Alabama

Military and Weapons 
PAF Air War College, a senior staff and war college of the Pakistan Air Force
Air Warfare Centre, a Royal Air Force Unit located at RAF Waddington and several other units around the UK
Air Weapons Complex, a development and production center for airborne weapons systems in Pakistan
Wiesel AWC, a kind of German armoured vehicle

Organizations
Afghan Women's Council
American Wood Council, affiliate of the American Forest & Paper Association
Association for Women in Communications
Australian Wildlife Conservancy

Other uses
Mitsubishi AWC, a four-wheel drive system developed by Mitsubishi Motors
Accept, Waiver and Consent, a FINRA Disciplinary Action
Astronaut Wives Club
Atlantic Wind Connection, an undersea transmission backbone for wind farms off the East coast. 
Available water capacity, the range of available water that can be stored in soil and be available for growing crops
Aviation Weather Center, part of the National Centers for Environmental Prediction in the U.S.
Avanti West Coast, A British train operating company.
Titan Airways' ICAO airline code
Alumina Limited's ASX/NYSE code
Arizona Western College, a community college in Yuma, Arizona